Thomas Parker may refer to:

Politicians
 Thomas Parker (died 1570) (c. 1510–1570), for Norwich
 Thomas Parker (died 1558) (by 1519–1558), MP for Cricklade
 Thomas Parker (died 1580) (by 1527–1580), MP for East Grinstead
 Thomas Parker (died 1663) (1595–1663), MP for Hastings, Seaford and Sussex
 Thomas Parker, 1st Earl of Macclesfield (1666–1732), English Whig politician
 Thomas Parker, 6th Earl of Macclesfield (1811–1896), British peer, formerly Conservative MP for Oxfordshire, 1837–1841
 Thomas Sutherland Parker (1829–1868), physician and political figure in Ontario, Canada
 Thomas Parker, 3rd Earl of Macclesfield (1723–1795), British peer and politician

Sportspeople
 Thomas Parker (rugby league), Welsh rugby league footballer of the 1920s and 1930s
 Thomas Parker (rower) (1883–?), Australian rower
 Thomas Parker (footballer) (1907–1964), English footballer
 Thomas Parker (cricketer) (1845–1880), English-born New Zealand cricketer

Others
 Thomas Parker (minister) (1595–1677), English nonconforming clergyman and founder of Newbury, Massachusetts
 Thomas Parker (deacon) (1605–1683), founder of Reading, Massachusetts and deacon of the 12th Congregational Church
 Sir Thomas Parker (judge) (1695–1784), Chief Baron of the Exchequer
 Thomas Parker (soldier, born 1753) (1753–1820), American soldier
 Thomas Parker (engineer) (1843–1916), British railway engineer
 Thomas Parker (inventor) (1843–1915), British electrical engineer and inventor
 Thomas Parker (Maine judge) (1783–1860), judge, writer, philanthropist
 Thomas Jeffery Parker (1850–1897), British zoologist
 Thomas Parker (soldier, born 1822), Union Army soldier and Medal of Honor recipient
 Thomas Lister Parker (1779–1858), English antiquary

See also 
 Tom Parker (disambiguation)
 Tommy Parker (disambiguation)